Edward a'Beckett  (18 January 1940 – 27 May 2011) was an Australian cricketer. He played one first-class cricket matches for Victoria in 1966.

See also
 List of Victoria first-class cricketers

References

External links
 

1940 births
2011 deaths
Australian cricketers
Victoria cricketers
Cricketers from Melbourne